Roupala montana is a species of shrub or tree in the family Proteaceae which is native to much of the Neotropics. It is a morphologically variable species with four recognised varieties. The species is used medicinally in Venezuela, and as an aphrodisiac in Trinidad and Tobago and Venezuela.

Description
The leaves are usually simple in adult plants, but are occasionally compound. It is an ochlospecies—a species that is highly variable morphologically, and that variability "cannot be satisfactorily accommodated within a formal classification"—with a very wide distribution. Consequently, a large number of species and varieties have been described based on variations between collections.

Taxonomy
The species was first described by Jean Baptiste Christophore Fusée Aublet in 1775. The name Roupala was based on roupale, a name used locally in French Guiana. The Latin specific epithet montana refers to mountains or coming from mountains.

In their 2007 monograph, Ghillean Prance, Katie S. Edwards and coauthors recognised four named varieties within the species: R. montana var. montana (the "nominate" variety, based on Aublet's original description of the species), R. montana var. brasiliensis (Klotzsch) K.S.Edwards, R. montana var. impressiuscula (Mez) K.S.Edwards and R. montana var. paraensis (Sleumer) K.S.Edwards.

Distribution
Roupala montana ranges from Mexico in the north, through Central America, to Trinidad and Tobago, and across South America to southern Bolivia, Argentina, Paraguay and southern Brazil.

Uses
The species is used for fuel wood, high quality charcoal, medicinally and to a limited extent for woodworking and construction, The wood is commonly used for wood turning and sold in small spindles and blocks. Specialist exotic wood suppliers typically refer to this timber as Leopardwood but it can be confused with other species such Lacewood (Panopsis -P. rubescens and P. sessilifolia). The wood shows strong figuring in quartersawn sections. It turns well and gives a good finish. 

It is one of several species including Parinari campestris and Richeria grandis which known by the common name bois bandé. These species are reputed to have aphrodisiac properties.

References

montana
Trees of Mexico
Trees of Central America
Trees of South America
Trees of Trinidad and Tobago
Flora of the Cerrado
Plants described in 1775
Trees of Argentina
Trees of Brazil
Trees of Peru
Trees of Venezuela